The 1896 Indiana Hoosiers football team was an American football team that represented Indiana University Bloomington during the 1896 college football season. In their first season under head coach Madison G. Gonterman, the Hoosiers compiled a 6–3 record and outscored their opponents 186 to 74.

Schedule

References

Indiana
Indiana Hoosiers football seasons
Indiana Hoosiers football